Syze is a village in Shchastia Raion (district) in Luhansk Oblast of eastern Ukraine, at about 10 km SE from the centre of Stanytsia Luhanska, at about 2 km west from the Russian border.

Syze was founded by Don Cossacks in the 17th century.

Demographics
In 2001 the village had 14 inhabitants. Native language as of the Ukrainian Census of 2001:
Russian — 78.57%
Ukrainian — 14.29%
Belarusian — 0.80%

References

External links
 Weather forecast for Syze

Villages in Shchastia Raion
Populated places established in 1950